Edith Arlene Peters (April 14, 1926 – October 28, 2000) was an American singer and actress. She appeared in more than sixteen films from 1957 to 1981.

Biography
Peters was the fourth of five sisters. Her sisters Virginia, Mattye and Anne were known as The Peters Sisters. She sang in a duo with her sister Joyce, also known as The Peters Sisters. 

In 1958 she married her Italian agent Silvio Catalano, and moved to Italy where she appeared in movies, commercials and TV dramas.

Filmography

References

External links

 

1926 births
2000 deaths
American film actresses
Musicians from Santa Monica, California
Actresses from Santa Monica, California
Singers from California
American television actresses
American expatriates in Italy
20th-century American actresses
20th-century American singers
20th-century American women singers